Omar Quintanilla (born October 24, 1981) is an American former professional baseball infielder. He played in Major League Baseball (MLB) for the Rockies (2005–2009), Texas Rangers (2011), New York Mets (2012, 2013-2014) and Baltimore Orioles (2012).

Early life
Quintanilla attended Socorro High School in El Paso, Texas, where he played with fellow teammate DR Melo. Quintanilla led the city of El Paso in home runs, RBI, and was elected to the Texas All-State shortstop. After graduating, he received a scholarship to the University of Texas, Austin, where he played for the Texas Longhorns baseball team. Quintanilla played second base, third base, and shortstop, and appeared in two national championship games, winning one. In 2002, he played collegiate summer baseball for the Cotuit Kettleers of the Cape Cod Baseball League.

Professional career
Quintanilla was drafted by the Oakland Athletics in the first round (33rd overall) of the 2003 Major League Baseball Draft. In , he played for the Vancouver Canadians of the Class A-Short Season Northwest League and High-A Modesto A's of the Class A-Advanced California League, batting .358 in 40 games. He started 2004 with Modesto as the Athletics' seventh ranked prospect and after hitting .315 received a late-season promotion to the Midland RockHounds for the Class AA Texas League. He began  with Midland as the A's 8th ranked prospect and on July 15, he was traded along with outfielder Eric Byrnes to the Colorado Rockies for pitchers Joe Kennedy and Jay Witasick.

Colorado Rockies
The Rockies assigned him to the Colorado Springs Sky Sox of the Class AAA Pacific Coast League (PCL). and promoted him to the majors in late July. He made his debut on July 31 and went 1-3. In each of the next three seasons, Quintanilla began the season with Triple-A Colorado Springs and was promoted to the majors at least once each season.

The Office of the Commissioner of Baseball announced August 11, 2010, that Quintanilla had received a 50-game suspension after testing positive for Methylhexaneamine, a performance-enhancing substance, in violation of the Minor League Drug Prevention and Treatment Program.

Texas Rangers
Quintanilla signed with the Texas Rangers after the season and in July 2011, he had his contract purchased by Texas after hitting .298 in 51 games with Round Rock Express of the PCL. On August 1, he was outrighted to back to Round Rock and elected free agency. Overall with the Rangers, he hit .045 in 11 games, with two RBI.

New York Mets
On January 3, 2012, Quintanilla signed a minor league contract with the New York Mets. On May 29, 2012, Quintanilla's contract was purchased by the New York Mets from Buffalo Bisons Class AAA International League after hitting .282 in 48 games. He first saw big-league action that same night, going 3-for-4 with 2 doubles in his debut against the Philadelphia Phillies at Citi Field. On June 1, 2012, Omar started at shortstop on the first ever no-hitter in New York Mets history thrown by Johan Santana. The New York Mets shut out the St Louis Cardinals 8-0. He was designated for assignment on July 17.

Baltimore Orioles

On July 20, 2012, Quintanilla was traded to the Baltimore Orioles for financial considerations.
He played 2nd base for the Orioles. He had 4 home runs and 15 RBIs.

Second stint with Mets
On January 5, 2013, Quintanilla signed a minor league deal with the New York Mets which included an invitation to Spring Training. His contract was purchased and he was subsequently called up on May 30 when shortstop Ruben Tejada was placed on the 15-day disabled list. The Mets moved closer Frank Francisco from the 15-day to the 60-day disabled list to make room on the 40 man roster. He became a free agent on December 2, 2013, after being non-tendered. He re-signed to a minor league deal in January 2014. He was designated for assignment on May 8, 2014. Quintanilla elected free agency in October 2014.

Second stint with Colorado Rockies
On January 30, 2015, Quintanilla signed a minor league contract with the Colorado Rockies. He was released on June 15, 2015 after appearing in only two games for the Modesto Nuts.

Toros de Tijuana
In 2016, Quintanilla made his debut in the Mexican League with the Toros de Tijuana. He became a free agent after the 2017 season.

References

External links

1981 births
Living people
American baseball players of Mexican descent
American expatriate baseball players in Canada
American expatriate baseball players in Mexico
American sportspeople in doping cases
Baltimore Orioles players
Baseball players from Texas
Buffalo Bisons (minor league) players
Colorado Rockies players
Colorado Springs Sky Sox players
Cotuit Kettleers players
Las Vegas 51s players
Major League Baseball second basemen
Major League Baseball shortstops
Mexican League baseball second basemen
Mexican League baseball shortstops
Mexican League baseball third basemen
Midland RockHounds players
Modesto A's players
Modesto Nuts players
New York Mets players
People from El Paso, Texas
Phoenix Desert Dogs players
Round Rock Express players
Texas Longhorns baseball players
Texas Rangers players
Toros de Tijuana players
Vancouver Canadians players